There are several lakes named Mud Lake within the U.S. state of Maine.

 Mud Lake, Aroostook County, Maine.	
 Mud Lake, Aroostook County, Maine.	
 Mud Lake, Aroostook County, Maine.	
 Mud Lake, Aroostook County, Maine.	
 Mud Lake, Aroostook County, Maine.	
 Mud Lake, Aroostook County, Maine.	
 Mud Lake, Aroostook County, Maine.	
 Mud Lake, Fish River chain of lakes. 
 Mud Lake, Washington County, Maine.	
 Mud Lake, Washington County, Maine.	
 Mud Lake, Washington County, Maine.

References
 USGS-U.S. Board on Geographic Names

Lakes of Aroostook County, Maine
Lakes of Washington County, Maine
Lakes of Maine